Elerithattu is located in West Eleri village, about 30 km east of Nileshwar in the Kasaragod district of Kerala in India. The settlement is situated in a sylvan environment, surrounded by rubber trees and various tropical vegetation.

Education 

Elerithattu Lower Primary School, is situated in the village. The E.K. Nayanar Memorial Government College  is co-located with the school. Mar Gregorios Memorial Upper Primary School (MGMUPS) and Varakkad high school are located at 1 km distance from Elerithattu.

History
Elerithattu was partly ruled by the Nileshwar Raja until the 1940s. During the Indian freedom struggle, the area was a local hub for communist movement. The area is still considered to be a strong fort for left wing political ideologies. Prominent left leaders such as E K Nayanar have spent time in exile at this place during the British rule, prior to the Indian independence in 1947. The early inhabitants of this place came from places such as Nileshwar, Cheruvathur and Payyanur, and they predominantly were nairs (nambiar).

Migration from South Kerala
During the middle of twentieth century, Christian and ezhava families migrated in large numbers and settled there. Most of such migration came from travancore and southern parts of Kerala. Thanks to the agrarian and fertile landscape prevailed then, many families decided to settle there and became integral part of the social setup.

Tribal  community
A small share of  tribal community (Mavilan, Malavettuva) also live in various parts of this locality. The tribal (mavilan) families among themselves used to speak  Tulu , but over time Malayalam has taken over and at present it is spoken uniformly across the society. Elerithattu is known to be quite and peaceful with different communities living in harmony.

Economy
Large section of people rely on individual agrarian income to make their livelihoods.

Education
There are many schools and high schools in Elerithattu but the biggest organization is the E.K. Nayanar Memorial Government College.  The college offers post-graduate course in Applied Economics and undergraduate courses in economics, Hindi, English and commerce.

Sports 
In the 1970s and 80s Elerithattu claimed to have a strong volleyball team in the locality, but these days cricket take precedence among the younger population.

Etymology
Even though there is no reported written reference to the origin of the name Elerithattu, a widely talked about story goes likes this. Geographically, this place is a flat locality situated at the top of a hill range. The term "thattu" is a Malayalam word for "flat surface". Years ago, Elerithattu and surrounding areas used to have a single season (in a year) paddy crop. Since the season for such a paddy cultivation coincided with the pre-monsoon time, the rice produced there came to be known as "elaya ari" referring to "early (to monsoon) rice" ("ari" in Malayalam when translated to English is rice grains and "elaya" stands for young or early). Over time, "Eleya Ari" shortened to become "eleri". "eleri" and "thattu" combined to reason out the current name of the locality.

Neighbouring places
Konnakkad and Kottancheri Hills are located within 20 kilometers from this locality. Cherupuzha, a local trading center is about 15 kilometers away. Bheemanady, Chittarikkal, Vellarikundu and Narkilakkad are the adjacent commercial localities. The nearest municipal town is Nileshwar.

Transportation
Local roads have access to NH.66 which connects to Mangalore in the north and Kannur in the south. The nearest railway station is Nileshwar on Mangalore-Palakkad line. There are airports at Mangalore and Kannur.

See also
 Hosdurg Taluk

References

Nileshwaram area